Alan Boyd is an American musician, sound engineer, record producer, and filmmaker who is best known for his work with the Beach Boys. Since the 1980s, he has been an archive manager for the band's Brother Records. Since 2000, he has worked alongside engineer Mark Linett on the Beach Boys' regular stream of archival releases. In 2013, Boyd was among the recipients of the Grammy Award for Best Historical Album for The Smile Sessions (2011).

Discography

Producer
 Hawthorne, CA (2001)
 The Smile Sessions (2011)
 Made in California (2013)
 Keep an Eye On Summer – The Beach Boys Sessions 1964 (2014)
 1967 – Sunshine Tomorrow (2017)
 Wake the World: The Friends Sessions (2018)
 I Can Hear Music: The 20/20 Sessions (2018)
 The Beach Boys On Tour: 1968 (2018)

Filmography
Directorials
 The Beach Boys: Nashville Sounds (1996)
 Hey, Hey We're the Monkees (1997)
 Endless Harmony: The Beach Boys Story (1998)
Producer
 The Beach Boys: An American Family (2000)

See also
 List of unreleased songs recorded by the Beach Boys

References

External links

 

American audio engineers
American record producers
Living people
Grammy Award winners
Place of birth missing (living people)
American documentary filmmakers
Year of birth missing (living people)